The 1980 WDF Europe Cup was the 2nd edition of the WDF Europe Cup darts tournament, organised by the World Darts Federation. It was held in Copenhagen, Denmark from October 3 to 4.

Entered Teams

11 national teams entered into the event.

References

Darts tournaments